Del Davis may refer to:

 Del Davis (high jumper) (born 1960), American high jumper
 Del Davis (singer), reggae singer of the 1970s
 Del Davis, a character in the film Blues in the Night